Michel Chauveau (born 1956) is a French historian and Egyptologist known for authoring Egypt in the Age of Cleopatra and Cleopatra: Beyond the Myth. Chauveau is Director of Studies at the École pratique des hautes études in Paris.

Bibliography 

 "Rive droite, rive gauche. Le nome panopolite au IIeet IIIe siècles de notre ère" in Perspectives on Panopolis. Brill Publishers. 2002.
 Cleopatra: Beyond the Myth. Levi. 1998.
 Egypt in the Age of Cleopatra. Hachette Books. 1997.
 Contr. Demotic Texts from the Collection: Carlsberg Papyri, Vo. 1. 1991.

References 

Living people
1956 births
French historians
French Egyptologists
Papyrologists